Fighting Caballero is a 1935 American black-and-white Western B-film produced by Weiss Productions Inc. and distributed by Superior Talking Pictures Inc. It was one of a series of Westerns starring Rex Lease.  It was produced by Louis Weiss from a screenplay by Elmer Clifton and George M. Merrick, and directed by Clifton.

Cast
Rex Lease as Jose Rodriguez, alias Joaquin Flores
Dorothy Gulliver as Pat
Earl Douglas as Pedro
George Chesebro as Devil Jackson
Robert Walker as Henchman Bull
Wally Wales as Henchman Wildcat
Milburn Moranti as Alkali Potts
George Morell as Si Jenkins
Pinkey Barnes as Mine Caretaker "Beetle"
Paul Ellis as Henchman Manuel
Marty Joyce as The Station Agent
Barney Furey as The Sheriff
Clyde McClary as The Deputy
Franklyn Farnum as Bartender

References

External links 
 

1935 films
1930s English-language films
American black-and-white films
Films directed by Elmer Clifton
1935 Western (genre) films
American Western (genre) films
1930s American films